The football tournament at the 2002 West Asian Games took place from 4 to 12 April 2002. It was originally scheduled for October 2001, but was postponed due to the September 11 attacks. Oman were originally scheduled to take part in group A along with Kuwait and Qatar but withdrew and the format was changed to round robin. All matches was played at the Mohammed Al-Hamad Stadium.

Kuwait won the gold medal, Iran and Syria were tied on second place, the silver medal was decided by a coin toss.

Results

References 
WAG federation website

External links 
 RSSSF

International association football competitions hosted by Kuwait
2001–02 in Kuwaiti football
West Asian Games
2002 West Asian Games